Polizeiregiment "Südtirol" (Police Regiment "South Tyrol"), later Bozen, and finally SS-Polizeiregiment "Bozen", was a military unit of the German  ("Order Police") recruited in the largely ethnic-German Alto Adige region in north-east Italy in late 1943, during the de facto German annexation of the region. The ranks were ethnically German Italian draftees while officers and NCOs were Germans.

On 23 March 1944 the 11th company of its 3rd battalion was the target of the Via Rasella attack in Rome, that led to the bloody German retaliation known as the Ardeatine massacre.

The regiment's first and second battalions were active in Istria and Belluno respectively, while the third battalion was a reserve unit stationed in Rome. All three surrendered to Allied or partisan forces in the last days of the war.

Background

Following the Badoglio Proclamation on 8 September 1943, the announcement of the Armistice of Cassibile, Germany launched an invasion of Italy. Two days later, South Tyrol, Trentino and Belluno came under German control as the Operational Zone of the Alpine Foothills (Operationszone Alpenvorland, OZAV). This region formally existed under the Italian Social Republic, but was de facto ruled by Franz Hofer, the Gauleiter of Tyrol-Vorarlberg.

The Central Recruitment Office was set up in South Tyrol by the Wehrmacht and Waffen-SS to form military units from residents of the OZAV. German authorities were at first limited to "Optanten," Tyroleans who had opted for German citizenship, but poor recruiting prompted Hofer to begin conscription in the region on 30 November 1943. All men born in 1924 and 1925 were drafted into the Todt Organization,  (SOD),  (CST), Ordnungspolizei, or into the Wehrmacht or Waffen-SS. A following ordinance on 7 January 1944 widened the draft pool to all men born between 1894 and 1926, regardless of nationality. , Tyroleans who had opted for Italian citizenship, were accused of treason and harassed. Many were sent to the Eastern Front. Draft evasion incurred a death sentence and persecution of relatives, according to the Nazi doctrine of Sippenhaft.

The forced recruit of the Dableiber and the harsh punishment dolled out against draft evaders, as was the case for Franz Thaler, violated Articles 44, 45, and 46 of the Hague Convention of 1899. Germany was a signatory to the 1889 convention.

Formation and equipment
Polizeiregiment "Südtirol" was formed in October 1943 under the command of Oberst Alois Menschick. By the end of the month the regiment, now called Polizeiregiment "Bozen", had over 2000 soldiers in four battalions, each composed of four, later three, numbered battalions (I, II, III). Its members were trained for three months in the use of their weapons, camouflage, squad combat, and counter-guerrilla warfare.

Members of SS-Polizeiregiment "Bozen" were almost exclusively equipped with Italian weapons, ranging from Carcano rifles to Beretta submachine guns. Italian belts, ammunition pouches as well as neckstraps in grey-green leather were also issued. Heavier weapons, like the Italian Breda light and heavy machineguns were also used. The uniform consisted of the regular blue-green wool uniform as worn by all Polizei members, worn with either a peaked cap or an overseas cap. German or Italian camouflage shelter halves, along with other garments made from Italian camouflage, was also heavily used.

In a court of cassation, members of the regiment testified that they were issued with six hand grenades and an MP 40. Regiment veteran Konrad Sigmund corroborated this and explained that five to six grenades would be attached to a single belt, to be used for a chain of explosions.

First battalion

I Battalion, composed of 900 men under the command of Major Oskar Kretschmer, was sent to Istria, then in the Operational Zone of the Adriatic Littoral (OZAK), in February 1944. Based out of the Opatija and under the direct command of the Ordnungspolizei commander in Trieste, Oberstleutnant Hermann Kintrup and indirectly commanded by the commander of the Waffen-SS in OZAK, Odilo Globočnik, was tasked with combating partisans and securing transportation routes from Trieste to Ljubljana. I Battalion was the only fully motorized battalion in the regiment, possessing an AB 41 and a Lancia 1ZM, both armored cars, and a single L3/33 and L3/35 tankette, all captured from the Italians after 8 September 1943.

The battalion then participated in Operation Braunschweig. On 30 April, German troops of the 278th Infantry and 188th Reserve Mountain Divisions, and the 24th Waffen-SS Karstjäger, razed the village of Lipa and killed its 263 inhabitants. Croatian researcher Petra Predoević found that some testimonies and archival data implicated the Bozen Regiment, whose attack by Yugoslav partisans have been the cause of the Lipa massacre.

As Axis forces withdrew from the Balkans, I Battalion was stationed at Ajdovščina, then in Tolmin. Finally, in an attempt to impede the British 8th Army, the battalion was sent to the Predil Pass, near the modern Italian-Slovene border. The prisoners were first transferred to Udine, then to Bellaria – Igea Marina and were guarded with greater attention by New Zealand and Polish soldiers. The escapees from Kötschach-Mauthen that made it home were required to appear at the "Vittorio-Veneto" barracks in Bolzano, arrested, put under surveillance, and transferred to Rimini and then to Taranto. All prisoners were released in September 1946.

Second battalion

II Battalion was sent to Belluno Province in February 1944 where, between March and December, it made 85 anti-partisan actions. As a result of their actions, 44 civilians were killed and another 645 made homeless by the destruction of 245 homes. In March 1945, II Battalion hung 14 civilians in Belluno's central square for the killing of thee soldiers by partisans. South Tyrolean historian  noted that the battalion, and the Bozen Regiment by extension, became infamous for its brutality in Belluno.

Most of II Battalion was taken prisoner by partisans at Agordo on 2 May 1945. The remaining prisoners were handed over to the Americans and joined I Battalion at Rimini. Like I Battalion, II Battalion was released from prison in September 1946.

Participants of the Biois valley massacre were tried in 1979, but acquitted on lack of evidence. When called to testify, they condemned the behavior of their former commanders. Erwin Fritz, then a resident of Göttingen, West Germany and a retired police commissioner, was tried in absentia because his extradition was refused. Fritz's defense was given to Roland Riz, the vice-president of the South Tyrolean People's Party, who requested an acquittal. Fritz was initially sentenced with life imprisonment by the Corte d'Assise of Bologna, which was rescinded by an appeal that found the sentence impotent by lack of jurisdiction. Fritz was again tried in 1988, by the Military Tribunal of Verona, but acquitted based on lack of evidence.

Third battalion
III Battalion was transferred to Rome over seven days, from 12 February to 19 February 1944, likely as an agreement between Hofer and Wolff. The transfer was carried out with great difficulty because of ongoing battles at Monte Cassino and at Anzio. Theoretically, III Battalion was under the command of Wolff, but was de facto commanded by Luftwaffe General Kurt Mälzer. After being captured, Wolff stated that III Battalion had been made available to Albert Kesselring upon his request to conduct police duties in Rome and to protect the Vatican. Previously, this had been carried out by the 2nd Fallschirmjäger Division.

The battalion, reduced to three companies, was housed in the attic of the Palazzo del Viminale, which had housed the Italian Ministry of the Interior before its transfer to Toscolano-Maderno. 9th Company supervised the construction of defensive works at Albano Laziale, 10th Company guarded the Vatican and public buildings, and 11th Company was a reserve. For rotation, the 11th would relieve the 10th on 24 March 1944.

Members of III Battalion, some of whom were Ladins and spoke German poorly, did not receive leave and were forbidden from interacting with Romans or attending church. The native German officers routinely insulted their charges during training, and nicknamed them the "Tyrolean blockheads" (Tiroler Holzköpfer).

Relationship with the Schutzstaffel
Like all German police units, the Polizeiregiment "Bozen" was under overall control of the SS. Nazi Germany began centralizing its police forces in January 1934, that come under SS control from April 1934, while retaining distinct uniforms, command structure, recruiting and most of the chain of command.

Identification with the Waffen-SS
In historiography since the Via Rasella attack, the third battalion of the Bozen Regiment was often erroneously identified as a Waffen-SS volunteer detachment. Italian historian , author of several works on the South Tyrolean police regiments, noted the frequency and repetition of this error. American journalist Robert Katz erroneously supported the idea of the battalion being part of the Waffen-SS in his work on the attack, Death in Rome. In it, he cites notes taken during an interview with ex-partisan Mario Fiorentini on 27 March 1965 stating that the men of the battalion wore SS markings on their uniform, while as part of the Ordnungspolizei all servicemen in the regiment wore standard German police green uniforms and insignia. Katz also reports that the Germans claimed that the battalion was not made up of soldiers, but old and infirm men, which Katz dismisses.

Notes

Citations

References

Secondary sources

News sources

Memoirs

External links
 Entry on the Atlas of Nazi and Fascist Massacres website (in Italian)
 Regimental History (in Italian)
 Südtiroler Archiv - Bildarchiv Urban Rienzner (in Italian)

Bozen
History of South Tyrol